Rodney Pol Jr. is an American attorney and politician serving as a member of the Indiana Senate from the 4th district. He assumed office on November 1, 2021.

Early life and education 
Pol was born in East Chicago, Indiana, and graduated from Chesterton High School. He earned a Bachelor of Arts degree in psychology, political science, and music from Indiana University Bloomington and a Juris Doctor from the Indiana University Robert H. McKinney School of Law.

Career 
In 2005 and 2006, Pol served as a legislative aide in the Indiana House of Representatives. As a college student, Pol worked as a flooring installer. Pol worked as a law clerk for the Lake County Circuit Court and Indiana Department of Education. Pol worked as the city attorney of Gary, Indiana from 2014 to 2021 and as a public defender in the Indiana State Public Defender's Office from 2010 to 2014. He was appointed to the Indiana Senate in November 2021, succeeding Karen Tallian.

References 

Living people
Democratic Party Indiana state senators
Indiana University Bloomington alumni
Indiana University–Purdue University Indianapolis alumni
Indiana University Robert H. McKinney School of Law alumni
Indiana lawyers
People from East Chicago, Indiana
People from Lake County, Indiana
Year of birth missing (living people)
Public defenders